Vlatko Vladičevski is a Macedonian former professional basketball player who played for clubs like MZT Skopje, and Rabotnički.

References

External links
 Basketball.eurobasket.com
 Novamakedonija.com.mk

Macedonian men's basketball players
Year of birth missing (living people)
Living people
KK MZT Skopje players
KK Rabotnički players